Fadette is an unincorporated community in Geneva County, Alabama, United States.

History
The community was named by H. A. Smith, who operated the first post office. The meaning of the community's name is uncertain. A post office operated under the name Fadette from 1891 to 1906.

References

Unincorporated communities in Geneva County, Alabama
Unincorporated communities in Alabama